Blowing in from Chicago is an album by American jazz saxophonists Clifford Jordan and John Gilmore featuring performances recorded in 1957 and released on the Blue Note label. The CD reissue added a bonus track from the same session.

Reception
The Allmusic review by Scott Yanow awarded the album a 5 stars stating: "Clifford Jordan's first date as a leader actually found him sharing a heated jam session with fellow tenor John Gilmore. [...] This was one of Gilmore's few sessions outside of Sun Ra. This session finds both young tenor men in fine form. Recommended."  The Penguin Jazz Guide suggests that the album may be “the neglected masterpiece of Blue Note hard bop”, noting that Gilmore plays in a style distinct from the freer approach he used with Sun Ra, and that Jordan solos powerfully but with “real thought and logic”.

Track listing
 "Status Quo" (John Neely) - 5:36
 "Bo-Till" (Cliff Jordan) - 5:56
 "Blue Lights" (Gigi Gryce) - 6:38
 "Billie's Bounce" (Charlie Parker) - 9:34
 "Evil Eye" (Jordan) - 5:14
 "Everywhere" (Horace Silver) - 5:45
 "Let It Stand" (Jordan, Gilmore) - 7:44 Bonus track on CD reissue

Personnel
Clifford Jordan, John Gilmore - tenor saxophone
Horace Silver - piano
Curly Russell - bass
Art Blakey – drums

References

Blue Note Records albums
Clifford Jordan albums
John Gilmore (musician) albums
1957 albums
Albums produced by Alfred Lion
Albums recorded at Van Gelder Studio
Horace Silver albums
Art Blakey albums
Curley Russell albums